Following are the results of the 1932–1936 Southern Oregon Raiders football teams.  The Southern Oregon University Raiders football team is a member of the National Association of Intercollegiate Athletics and is not associated with any conference. Southern Oregon's first football team was fielded in 1927. The team plays its home games at Raider Stadium, in Ashland, OR.

1932

† Homecoming

1933

† Homecoming

1934

† Homecoming

Southern Oregon Raiders football seasons